Christopher Plunket, 2nd Earl of Fingall and 11th Baron Killeen (died 1649) was an Irish politician and soldier. In 1641 he negotiated with the rebels on behalf of the Old English of the Pale and pushed them to join the rebellion. He fought for the rebels at the siege of Drogheda. He joined the Confederates and fought in their Leinster army, notably at Dungan's Hill. When the Confederates fused into the Royalist Alliance, he fought under James Butler, 1st Duke of Ormond in the Battle of Rathmines where he was wounded and taken prisoner. He died of his wounds two weeks later in captivity at Dublin Castle.

Birth and origins 
Christopher was probably born in the late 1610s in County Meath, Ireland. He was the eldest son of Lucas Plunket and his second wife Susanna Brabazon. His father was then the 10th Baron Killeen (since 1613) and would on 26 September 1628 be created Earl of Fingall. His father's family is believed to be of Norman origin and is attested in Ireland from the 11th century onwards.

His mother was the fifth daughter of Edward Brabazon, 1st Baron Ardee and his wife Mary Smythe. Her grandfather had come from England to Ireland as vice-treasurer of Ireland and had been Lord Justice of Ireland. His parents had married in 1611.

Christopher was the eldest of at least four brothers (but only Christopher and George are known):
 Christopher (died 1649)
 George, the fourth son, married Cicely, daughter of Sir William Hill, of Allenston, County Meath, was captain at the siege of Drogheda, and colonel of a regiment of foot in the Confederate army

Early life 
Christopher's mother died in 1623. She had been a Protestant. After her death, his father made sure that Christopher would be raised in the Catholic faith.

Marriage and children 
in January 1636 Killeen married Mabel, daughter of Nicholas Barnewall, 1st viscount Kingsland and Lady Bridget FitzGerald. She would survive him by 50 years and would, in 1653, remarry to Colonel James Barnewall, youngest son of Sir Patrick Barnewall.

 
Christopher and Mabel had five sons (of which the younger three are poorly known):
 Luke (1639–1684), his heir, who recovered the estate and title in 1662.
 Nicholas, married Anne Taaffe, daughter of Theobald Taaffe, 1st Earl of Carlingford
  (died 1664) buried at St. Catherine, 20 September
 Patrick (died 1666), buried at St Michan's, 3 June
  of county Monaghan

—and a daughter:
 Mary, married Walter Butler of Garryricken, nephew of James Butler, 1st Duke of Ormonde: they were the grandparents of John Butler, 15th Earl of Ormonde.

Honours and parliament 
In 1637 Killeen succeeded his father as the 2nd Earl of Fingall. On 20 March that year Lord Fingall received special livery of his estates. he inherited great estates in County Meath and County Cavan, and played a part in developing the town of Virginia, County Cavan.

Lord Fingall took his seat in the House of Lords of the Irish Parliament on 16 March 1639, and was a member of several committees for privileges and grievances.

Irish wars, death, and timeline 
When the Rebellion broke out on 23 October 1641, Fingall tried to stay neutral between the government and the rebel as most of the nobility and gentry of the Pale did. On 16 November he was appointed a commissioner to negotiate with the rebels, "with a view to suspend for some time the sad effects of licentiousness and rapine, until the kingdom was put in a better posture of defence".

His behaviour caused him to be mistrusted by the Government, and on 17 November he was proclaimed an outlaw. He thereupon played a prominent role in bringing about an alliance between the Ulster party and the nobility and gentry of the Pale. He was present at the meeting at the Hill of Crofty, and subsequently at that at the Hill of Tara, where he was appointed general of the horse for the county of Meath. He, therefore, led the rebel horse at the siege of Drogheda. His name is attached to the principal documents drawn up by the Irish Confederates in justification of their taking up arms. He was a member of the general assembly of the Confederation of Kilkenny, and, by taking the oath of association against the papal nuncio Giovanni Battista Rinuccini in June 1648, proved his fidelity to the original demands of the confederates; but otherwise, he played an inconspicuous part in the history of the confederation.

Death in battle 
On 2 August 1649 Lord Fingall fought under James Butler, 1st Duke of Ormond at the battle of Rathmines where he was wounded and taken prisoner by the Parliamentarians. He died of his wounds about a fortnight later while in captivity in Dublin Castle. He was buried in St Catherine's Church on 18 August. The Parliamentarians accused him of high treason, and his estates were confiscated by the English Commonwealth's Act for the Settlement of Ireland on 12 August 1652 and Beaulieu was given to Sir Henry Tichborne as tenant to the state by Cromwell. Fingall's son and heir by 1677 had recovered much of the family property, but Beaulieu was permanently lost to the Plunketts.

Notes and references

Notes

Citations

Sources 
Subject matter monographs:
Click here. Robert Dunlop 1896 in Dictionary of National Biography
Click here. Ohlmeyer 2004 in Oxford Dictionary of National Biography

 
  – 1643 to 1644
 
  – D to F (for Fingall)
  – N to R (for Ormonde)
  – Eardley of Spalding to Goojerat
  – Scotland and Ireland
 
 
 
  – (for timeline)
  – Viscounts, barons
  – House of Lords
 
  – 1641 to 1643

 

1649 deaths
17th-century Irish people
Earls of Fingall
People from County Meath
Year of birth unknown